Ripkin is a 1978 Australian television film directed by Frank Arnold and starring David Nettheim, Olivia Hamnett, Vince Martin, and Belinda Giblin. The screenplay concerns an industrial scientist and his wife, who suspect each other of infidelity.

References

External links

Australian television films
1978 films
1970s English-language films
Films directed by Frank Arnold
1970s Australian films